KHYY (107.3 FM, "The Trail 107.3") is a radio station broadcasting a classic country music format. Licensed to Minatare, Nebraska, in the United States, the station is currently owned by Nebraska Rural Radio Association.

Ownership
In May 2013, Armada Media and Legacy Broadcasting traded some stations in Nebraska, with two stations in Holdrege (KUVR/1380 and KMTY/97.7) going to Legacy and eight others in the Scottsbluff and North Platte markets KZTL/93.5 (Paxton-North Platte) and KRNP/100.7 (Sutherland-North Platte)  KOAQ/690 (Terrytown), KOLT/1320 (Scottsbluff), KMOR/93.3 (Gering), KETT/99.3 (Mitchell), KOZY-FM/101.3 (Bridgeport), KHYY/106.9 (Minatare) going to Armada Media. A purchase price was not announced. The station was eventually purchased by the Nebraska Rural Radio Association.

References

External links
Official Website

HYY
Classic country radio stations in the United States